Sangnoksu station is a railway station on Seoul Subway Line 4. The station is located in Ansan-si, Gyeonggi-do. It is located between Banwol station and Hanyang Univ. at Ansan station. Its station subname is Ansan Univ.

Sangnoksu means "Evergreen Tree". The station, just like its Sangnok-gu neighborhood, is named  after the book Sangnoksu (1935) by Sim Hun.

Surroundings 
Around the station, there are 'Maehwa Elementary School, Sangro Elementary School, Sangro Middle School, Ansan University, Ansan Botanical Garden, and Danwon Sculpture Park.

Station layout

References

Metro stations in Ansan
Seoul Metropolitan Subway stations
Railway stations opened in 1988